Boogie Woogie Christmas is a 2002 Christmas album recorded by the Brian Setzer Orchestra.

Track listing

Original
"Jingle Bells" - 2:22
"Boogie Woogie Santa Claus" - 3:02
"Winter Wonderland" - 2:40
"Blue Christmas" - 2:48
"Santa Claus Is Back in Town" - 3:48
"Baby, It's Cold Outside" (duet with Ann-Margret) - 3:43
"The Nutcracker Suite" - 7:13
"(Everybody's Waitin' for) The Man with the Bag" - 2:48
"Sleigh Ride" - 2:40
"So They Say It's Christmas" - 4:46
"O Holy Night" - 4:49
"The Amens" - 0:59

Bonus Tracks

2003 Re-Release
"Let It Snow, Let It Snow, Let It Snow" (Target Exclusive) - 2:09
"Run Rudolph Run" (K-Mart Exclusive) - 3:31
"What Are You Doin' New Year's Eve" (Wal-Mart Exclusive) - 3:34
"Cactus Christmas" (Best Buy Exclusive) - 2:46

2004 Re-Release

"Run Rudolph Run" - 3:31
"Cactus Christmas" - 2:46
"Santa Drives a Hot Rod" (Target Exclusive) - 4:05 
"Christmas Island" (Target Exclusive) - 2:23

References

The Brian Setzer Orchestra albums
2002 Christmas albums
Albums produced by Peter Collins (record producer)
Christmas albums by American artists
Swing Christmas albums